Aladár Bitskey (18 October 1905 – 18 March 1991) was a Hungarian swimmer who won silver medals at the European championships of 1927 and 1931 in the 100 m backstroke. He competed in the same event at the 1928 Summer Olympics, but did not reach the final.

His elder brother, Zoltán Bitskey, was also a Hungarian Olympic swimmer.

References

External links

1905 births
1991 deaths
Sportspeople from Eger
Swimmers at the 1928 Summer Olympics
Olympic swimmers of Hungary
Hungarian male swimmers
European Aquatics Championships medalists in swimming
Male backstroke swimmers